Begonia maculata (maculata meaning "spotted"), the polka dot begonia, is a species of begonia native to southeast Brazil. It grows naturally in the Atlantic rainforest, with occurrences confirmed in the Brazilian states of Espírito Santo and Rio de Janeiro. It has been introduced into Mexico, Cuba, the Dominican Republic, and Argentina. 

Begonia maculata has green oblong leaves with silver dots. The undersides of the leaves are red-purple. The plant grows white flowers in clusters with yellow centers on a single stem. The best conditions for propagating Begonia maculata are bright, indirect light and water poured just below the surface of the soil anytime it seems dry to the touch. Use filtered water or rainfall, it requires less water but more often than other tropical plants.

References

maculata
House plants
Endemic flora of Brazil
Flora of Southeast Brazil
Plants described in 1820